Sassafras are a rock band from South Wales first formed in 1970. They play a mix of rock and roll, progressive rock and country rock with the emphasis on vocal harmony. The use of twin guitar solos, played by original members Dai Shell and Ralph Evans, continues to be a distinctive feature of their music. The band holds the UK record for the group performing the greatest number of live gigs in a year.

History
The band was formed in South Wales in 1970  with guitarist Ralph Evans, bassist Ricky John Holt and drummer Rob Reynolds. David (Dai) Shell, a noted Cardiff guitarist, joined soon afterwards.

The band signed to George Martin’s AIR Productions in 1972 with a line-up completed by Terry Bennett on vocals and Robert 'Congo' Jones on drums. The band released their debut album, Expecting Company, on Polydor in 1973.

The band toured America's larger venues with such headlining groups as Ten Years After, Fleetwood Mac and Peter Frampton, played at festivals and achieved good press coverage, but never found real commercial success.

The band has been described as "a sort-of Welsh Fleetwood Mac/Eagles hybrid, with soaring west-coast melodies and a real roadtrip rock feel". In the early 1970s they held the record for highest number of gigs in a single year, with their 332 beating Slade by one. The band were still performing in 2022 .

Galloni, James and Ray Jones later joined Son of Man, led by George Jones, who play music by Man, as well as their own compositions.

Personnel

 Dai Shelllead guitar
 Ralph Evanslead guitar
 Rob Reynoldsdrums
 Ricky John Holtbass
 Terry Bennettvocals.com
 Steve Finn
 Robert 'Congo' Jonesdrums
 Ray Jonesbass guitar, vocals 
 Richard Gallonivocals 
 Garry Davisdrums
 Marco Jameskeyboards
 Chris Sharleydrumsr
 Andy Colesdrums

Discography

Singles
"Oh My (Don't It Make You Want To Cry)", 1974, Polydor: 2058 497
"Wheelin' 'N' Dealin'", 1975, Chrysalis: CHS 2063

Albums
Expecting Company, 1973, Polydor: 2383 245 (reissued on CD, 2014, Esoteric Recordings)
Wheelin' 'N' Dealin''', 1975, Chrysalis: CHR 1076Riding High, 1976, Chrysalis: CHR 1100Sassafras Live, 2002, Iberico Records: IB89001	Wheelin' 'N' Dealin' / Riding High, 2005, Gott Discs: GOTTCD026Expecting Company, 2014, CD re-issue, Esoteric Recordings, plus two bonus tracks

DVDs
 Sassafras Live DVD'', 2002, Iberico Records

References

External links
Sassafras at discogs.com
Busted Country Blues at soundcloud.com

Welsh rock music groups
Musical groups established in 1970
1970 establishments in Wales
Polydor Records artists
Chrysalis Records artists